Aline Poulin (September 14, 1965 – August 25, 2011) was a writer in Quebec, Canada.

She was born in Sherbrooke, Quebec and earned a bachelor's degree in literary and cultural studies and a master's degree and doctorate in French studies. Poulin worked as an archivist at the cultural centre of the University of Sherbrooke, as a researcher and editor at the Carrefour de solidarité internationale and as a literary reporter for radio station CFLX-FM. She also taught literature at the Cégep de Granby Haute-Yamaska.

Poulin died in Granby from cancer at the age of 45.

References 

1965 births
2011 deaths
Canadian women poets
Deaths from cancer in Quebec
Writers from Sherbrooke